The Sommerkahl (in its upper course: Speckkahl) is a small river in the northern Spessart in Lower Franconia, Bavaria, Germany. Near Langenborn the Sommerkahl empties from the left into the Kahl. Together with Westerbach, Reichenbach and Geiselbach the Sommerkahl is one of the largest tributaries of the Kahl.

See also
List of rivers of Bavaria

References 

Rivers of Bavaria
Rivers of Germany